NK Suhopolje Virovitica is a Croatian football club based in a village Suhopolje, in the region of Slavonia.
Biggest success of the club was playing in 1.HNL, when, under the name Mladost 127 achieved 3rd place in 1.A Croatian football league.
In the year 2001, the club changed name from NK Mladost 127 to HNK Suhopolje.

Honours 
Treća HNL – North (1): 2005–06
Treća HNL – East (1): 2007–08
1.ŽNL  – Virovitičko-podravska (3): 2015–16, 2016–17, 2017–18

External links
HNK Suhopolje at Nogometni magazin 

Association football clubs established in 1912
Football clubs in Croatia
Football clubs in Virovitica-Podravina County
1912 establishments in Croatia